Radha Iyengar Plumb is an American government official who is the nominee for the post of Deputy Under Secretary of Defense for Acquisition and Sustainment.

She is currently the Chief of Staff to the Deputy Secretary of Defense.

Education
Plumb has a Ph.D. and MS in Economics from Princeton University and a BS from the Massachusetts Institute of Technology.

Career
Before working as the Chief of Staff, she was the Director of Research and Insights for Trust and Safety at Google. She has also worked as the Global Head of Policy Analysis at Facebook. She has been a senior economist at RAND Corporation and has also held senior staff positions at the Department of Defense, Department of Energy, and the White House National Security Council. She co-hosted the Bombshell podcast for several years along with Erin Simpson and Loren DeJonge Schulman.

Biden administration nomination
On June 15, 2022, President Joe Biden nominated Plumb to be deputy undersecretary of defense for acquisition and sustainment. Hearings were held before the [[Senate Armed Services Committee on July 28, 2022. During that hearing, Senator Dan Sullivan placed a hold on Plumb's nomination over a dispute with the Biden administration over a mining project in his home state of Alaska. The committee favorably reported Plumb's nomination to the Senate floor on September 28, 2022. Plumb's nomination expired at the end of the year and was returned to President Biden on January 3, 2023.

Plumb was renominated the same day. The committee favorably reported Plumb's nomination to the Senate floor on February 9, 2023. The nomination is currently pending before the full United States Senate.

Personal life
Plumb is married to John F. Plumb, who currently serves in another post within the United States Department of Defense.

References

Living people

Year of birth missing (living people)
Massachusetts Institute of Technology alumni
Princeton University alumni
United States Department of Defense officials
Biden administration personnel